Ashton is an unincorporated community in Ben Hill County, in the U.S. state of Georgia.

History
A post office called Ashton was established in 1901, and remained in operation until 1907. The community had a railroad depot on the Atlantic and Birmingham railroad. Ashton once had a schoolhouse, now defunct.

References

Unincorporated communities in Ben Hill County, Georgia
Unincorporated communities in Georgia (U.S. state)